The 1841 rebellion in Guria was a conflict in the former Georgian principality of Guria, at that time part of the Georgia-Imeretia Governorate of the Russian Empire, that took place as a reaction to the government's newly introduced duties and taxes for the Georgian peasants. The rebels, joined by several nobles, were initially successful in overrunning much of Guria, but they were finally defeated by the Imperial Russian Army and the allied Georgian nobility in September 1841.

Background
Guria, a small and poor Georgian rural province on the Black Sea, had been under the Russian hegemony since 1810. In 1829, the Russians eliminated the local autonomous princely rule and imposed a Russian administration. The province had already been a scene of anti-Russian insurrection in 1820 and would gain more notability with a popular Social-Democratic uprising in 1905.

Rebellion
In 1841, without regard to local conditions, the Russian government ordered Gurian peasants to cultivate potatoes and to pay their taxes in Russian cash. Guria still maintained a primarily natural economy based on corn and millet. Rumors began to spread among the peasants that money payments would soon be required and that peasants would be drafted into the army.

When the tax collections began in May 1841, the peasants of the Lanchkhuti community resisted and took to arms on May 22, 1841. The disturbances spread through all Guria and soon the rebels had almost 7,200 men in their ranks. They took control of most fortified points in the province and blocked roads leading to the city of Kutaisi. On August 9, 1841, the insurgents headed by Abes Bolkvadze clashed with the Russian troops of Colonel Brusilov at Gogoreti, inflicted heavy casualties upon them and forced Brusilov to retreat. Twice that month the Gurians tried but failed to take Ozurgeti, the principal town of Guria and the last remaining outpost of the Russians. Dissension within the rebel ranks led to the defection of many noble allies, most importantly of Prince David Gugunava. Eventually, on September 5, some 2,500 regular Russian troops under Colonel Moisey Argutinsky-Dolgorukov—aided by the volunteer units provided by the pro-Russian nobles—attacked the rebels and defeated them, killing more than 60. By late September Guria was again calm and under the Russian control, but the government made no further effort to collect taxes in cash or cultivate potatoes. By 1842, most arrested rebel leaders were released, except Prince Ambako Shalikashvili, who was banished to Siberia. According to a Russian source published in 1901, the Russian losses in the rebellion were at least 32 killed, 115 wounded, and 17 captured.

The rebellion was described by the peasant writer Egnate Ninoshvili (1859–1894) in his historical novel, The Revolt in Guria, which was screened by the pioneering Georgian film director Alexander Tsutsunava in 1928.

References

Guria
Conflicts in 1841
1840s in Georgia (country)
19th-century rebellions
Rebellions against the Russian Empire
Uprisings of Georgia (country)
1841 in the Russian Empire
Guria